Sidney Morgenbesser (September 22, 1921 – August 1, 2004) was a Jewish American philosopher and professor at Columbia University. He wrote little but is remembered by many for his philosophical witticisms.

Life and career
Sidney Morgenbesser was born on September 22, 1921, in New York City and raised in Manhattan's Lower East Side.

Morgenbesser undertook philosophical study at the City College of New York and rabbinical study at the Jewish Theological Seminary of America. He then pursued graduate study in philosophy at the University of Pennsylvania. There he obtained his M.A. in 1950 and, with a thesis titled Theories And Schemata In The Social Sciences, his PhD in 1956. It was also at Pennsylvania, Morgenbesser records, that he would have his first job teaching philosophy.

Morgenbesser taught at Swarthmore College and then The New School for Social Research. He then took a position at Columbia University in 1954. He was a Guggenheim Fellow in 1963, and by 1966 he was made a full professor at Columbia. He was visiting professor at the Rockefeller University in 1967—1968 and in 1975 was named the John Dewey Professor of Philosophy at Columbia. This position he held until retirement.

Morgenbesser's areas of expertise included the philosophy of social science, political philosophy, epistemology, and the history of American Pragmatism.  He founded the Society for Philosophy and Public Affairs along with G.A. Cohen, Thomas Nagel and others.

Morgenbesser appeared on in an interview by Bryan Magee on the topic of American Pragmatism in 1987 that is available on YouTube.

He died on 1 August 2004 at St. Luke's-Roosevelt Hospital Center in Manhattan at the age of 82.

Influence

Morgenbesser was known particularly for his sharp witticisms and humor which often penetrated to the heart of the philosophical issue at hand, on which account The New York Times Magazine dubbed him the "Sidewalk Socrates." According to one anecdote, when J. L. Austin claimed that, although a double negative often implies a positive meaning (e.g., "he is not unlike his sister"), there is no language in which a double positive implies a negative, Morgenbesser retorted: "Yeah, yeah." In another commonly reported story, Morgenbesser was asked by a student whether he agreed with Chairman Mao's view that a statement can be both true and false at the same time, to which Morgenbesser replied "Well, I do and I don't."

Another anecdote is given as follows by the Independent:

Morgenbesser published little and established no school, but was revered for his extraordinary intelligence and moral seriousness. He was a famously influential teacher; his former students included Jerry Fodor, Raymond Geuss, Alvin Goldman, Daniel M. Hausman, Robert Nozick, Hilary Putnam, Gideon Rosen, Mark Steiner, and Michael Stocker. In 1967, Morgenbesser signed a letter declaring his intention to refuse to pay taxes in protest against the U.S. war in Vietnam, and urging other people to also take this stand.

Works
Books, (co-)edited

 (1960) with Arthur Danto [preface by Ernest Nagel], Philosophy of Science (New York).
 (1962) with James Walsh, Free Will, (Englewood Cliffs, N.J.,).
(1967) Philosophy of Science Today, US: Basic Books Inc. 
(1969) with Patrick Suppes and Morton White, Philosophy, Science, and Method: Essays in Honor of Ernest Nagel 
(1974) with Virginia Held and Thomas Nagel, Philosophy, Morality, and International Affairs: essays edited for the Society for Philosophy and Public Affairs. New York: Oxford University Press. .
(1977) Dewey and His Critics: Essays from the Journal of Philosophy (New York). 

Select articles, book chapters (co-)authored

“The Decline of Religious Liberalism,” The Reconstructionist 19 (1953): 17–24. 
"On the Justification of Beliefs and Attitudes." The Journal of Philosophy, vol. 51, no. 20, 1954, pp. 565–576 
"Character and Free Will," with Arthur Danto, The Journal of Philosophy, Vol. 54, No. 16 (Aug. 1, 1957), pp. 493–505
"Approaches to Ethical Objectivity," Educational Theory 7 (1957): 180–86.
 “Social Inquiry and Moral Judgement,” in Philosophy and Education, ed. Israel Scheffler (1958): 180–200.
 “Role and Status of Anthropological Theories,” Science 128 (1958): 72–9.
 “The Deductive Model and Its Qualifications,” in Induction: Some Current Issues, ed. Henry Kyburg and Ernest Nagel (1963), pp. 169–80.
 “Perception: Cause and Achievement,” in Boston Studies in the Philosophy of Science, ed. Marx Wartofsky (1963), pp. 206–12.
"Belief and Disposition," with Isaac Levi American Philosophical Quarterly, vol. 1, no. 3, 1964, pp. 221–232.
 “Is It Science?” Social Research 33 (1966): 255–71.
 “The Realist-instrumentalist Controversy,” in Philosophy, Science and Method: Essays in Honor of Ernest Nagel (1969), pp. 200–18.
“Imperialism: Some Preliminary Distinctions,” Philosophy & Public Affairs 3 (1973): 3–44.
 “Experimentation and Consent: A Note,” in Philosophical Medical Ethics: Its Nature and Significance ed. Stuart Spicker and H. Tristam Engelhardt (1977), pp. 97–110.
 “Picking and Choosing,” with E. Ullman-Marglit, Social Research 44 (1977): 757–85.
 “The Questions of Isaiah Berlin,” with J. Lieberson, New York Review of Books 27 (1980): 38–42.

For a more complete record of publications see "Sidney Morgenbesser: A Bibliography" in the below.

Festschrift

 How Many Questions?: Essays in Honour of Sidney Morgenbesser, (eds.) Leigh S. Cauman, Isaac Levi, Charles D. Parsons and Robert Schwartz (1983)

References

External links

 The Witty Professor, NPR
Columbia News death notice (archived)
Columbia College Today: Remembering Sidney Morgenbesser - memoirs by David Albert, Arthur C. Danto and Mark Steiner (also archived here)
 Sidney Morgenbesser, Crooked Timber
 Sidney, by Leon Wieseltier, The New Republic
Sidney Morgenbesser interviewed by Bryan Magee on American Pragmatism (Video).

1921 births
2004 deaths
20th-century American essayists
20th-century American Jews
20th-century American male writers
20th-century American non-fiction writers
20th-century American philosophers
20th-century atheists
21st-century American essayists
21st-century American Jews
21st-century American male writers
21st-century American non-fiction writers
21st-century American philosophers
21st-century atheists
American anti–Vietnam War activists
Jewish American atheists
American ethicists
American logicians
American male essayists
American male non-fiction writers
American philosophy academics
American political philosophers
American social commentators
American tax resisters
Aphorists
Atheist philosophers
Columbia University faculty
Epistemologists
Historians of philosophy
Humor researchers
Irony theorists
Jewish philosophers
Metaphysicians
Ontologists
Philosophers of culture
Philosophers of education
Philosophers of history
Philosophers of language
Philosophers of logic
Philosophers of mind
Philosophers of religion
Philosophers of science
Philosophers of social science
Philosophy writers
Probability theorists
Rhetoric theorists
Social philosophers
Trope theorists
Writers about activism and social change